97 Aquarii  (abbreviated 97 Aqr) is a binary star system in the equatorial constellation of Aquarius. 97 Aquarii is the Flamsteed designation. The combined apparent visual magnitude of the system is 5.20; the brighter star is magnitude 5.59 while the companion is magnitude 6.72.

The two stars in this system orbit each other over a period of 64.62 years at an eccentricity of 0.14. Both are A-type main sequence stars; the primary has a stellar classification of A2 V while its companion is A7 V. Their composite spectrum shows the properties of a Lambda Boötis star, which means it displays peculiar abundances of certain elements.

References

External links
 Image 97 Aquarii

Aquarius (constellation)
Binary stars
A-type main-sequence stars
Aquarii, 097
220278
Lambda Boötis stars
8890
Durchmusterung objects
115404